The 2018 Florida Attorney General election took place on November 6, 2018, to elect the Attorney General of Florida. Incumbent Republican Attorney General Pam Bondi was term-limited and could not seek re-election to a third consecutive term.

Republican candidate Ashley Moody defeated Democrat Sean Shaw, with the election being called after 93% of the precincts reporting. Moody won by about 6 percentage points, which was the widest margin of any Florida statewide race in 2018.

Republican primary

Candidates

Declared
 Ashley Moody, former judge of the Thirteenth Judicial Circuit Court of Florida
 Frank White, state representative

Withdrawn
 Ross Spano, state representative (withdrew to run for Congress)
 Jay Fant, state representative

Declined
 Rob Bradley, state senator
 Richard Corcoran, Speaker of the Florida House of Representatives
 Ron DeSantis, U.S. Representative and candidate for U.S. Senate in 2016 (running for governor)
 José Félix Díaz, former state representative and 2017 State Senate candidate
 Matt Gaetz, U.S. Representative
 Tom Grady, Florida Board of Education member and former state representative
 Simone Marstiller, former judge of the Florida First District Court of Appeal and former Florida Associate Deputy Attorney General
 Bill McCollum, former attorney general, former U.S. Representative, candidate for governor in 2010
 Joe Negron, president of the Florida Senate and nominee for FL-16 in 2006
 Tom Rooney, U.S. Representative
 David Simmons, state senator
 Dana Young, state senator

Endorsements

Polling

Results

Democratic primary

Candidates

Declared
 Sean Shaw, state representative
 Ryan Torrens, attorney

Declined
 Mitchell Berger, attorney
 José Javier Rodríguez, state senator (running for FL-27)
 Katherine Fernandez Rundle, Miami-Dade State Attorney
 Jack Seiler, Mayor of Fort Lauderdale
 Rod Smith, former state senator, former chair of the Florida Democratic Party, candidate for governor in 2006 and nominee for lieutenant governor in 2010
 Ryan Yadav, attorney and 2016 State House candidate

Endorsements

Results

Independents

Candidates
 Jeffrey Siskind, attorney

General election

Polling

with Frank White

Results

County results

See also
 Florida Attorney General

References

External links
Official campaign websites
Sean Shaw (D) for Attorney General
Ashley Moody (R) for Attorney General
Jeffrey Marc Siskind (I) for Attorney General

Attorney General
Florida
Florida Attorney General elections